"New York at War" was a military parade and civilian home front procession held supporting the World War II mobilization effort on June 13, 1942.  It was considered at the time the largest parade ever held in New York City, with up to 500,000 marching up Fifth Avenue (from Washington Square Park to 79th Street) and 2,500,000 spectators in attendance.

The parade coincided with a global "United Nations Day" launched by President Franklin Roosevelt tied to US Flag Day on June 14, six months after the Declaration by United Nations.

Hugo Gellert led a committee of artists that designed the approximately 300 floats in the parade.

The march was organized by Mayor Fiorello H. La Guardia as honorary chairman, his deputy Grover Whalen as chairman, and General Hugh Aloysius Drum as grand marshal.  Other dignitaries on the reviewing stand included Governor Herbert H. Lehman, Vice President Henry A. Wallace, the exiled King George II of Greece and Prime Minister Emmanouil Tsouderos, President of the Philippines Manuel L. Quezon, Duchess of Windsor Wallis Simpson, and Princess Märtha of Sweden.

Despite a celebration of groups including German Americans and Italian Americans, Japanese Americans were excluded from the march, leading to objections from the American Civil Liberties Union.

See also
Operation Pastorius, German saboteurs in Manhattan at time of parade
New York City Victory Parade of 1946

References

External links
Mayor's Committee for Mobilization "New York at War" - The Plan of the Demonstration, 1942
American on the March! Paramount News

United States home front during World War II
1942 in New York City
Military parades in the United States
Parades in New York City
1942 in military history
June 1942 events